KPDO is a community radio station licensed on 89.3 MHz at Pescadero, California.  It is non-commercial and listener-sponsored.

The station provides public affairs, news, and music programming, both locally and nationally sourced.

, the FCC had granted special temporary authority to remain silent until June 2012. KPDO resumed operating on June 14, 2012.

See also
 Community radio

References

External links

PDO
PDO
Mass media in the San Francisco Bay Area
Community radio stations in the United States
Variety radio stations in the United States
2010 establishments in California
Radio stations established in 2010